Picquigny station (French: Gare de Picquigny) is a railway station located in the commune of Picquigny in the Somme department, France. The station is served by TER Hauts-de-France trains (Abbeville - Amiens - Albert line).

See also
List of SNCF stations in Hauts-de-France

References

Railway stations in France opened in 1847
Railway stations in Somme (department)